Mitchell Lewis (born 14 October 1998) is a professional Australian rules footballer playing for the Hawthorn Football Club in the Australian Football League (AFL).

Early career
A gifted sportsman as a schoolboy, Lewis had to choose between football, cricket and golf. Good enough to play district cricket and playing off a golfing handicap of 1, Lewis choose football and played for the Calder Cannons.

AFL career
Lewis was drafted by Hawthorn with their second selection and seventy-sixth overall in the 2016 AFL draft.

Played 13 games for Box Hill in the VFL in 2017 before he required a shoulder reconstruction. He continued to develop in 2018 averaging 3 goals a game for Box Hill. Lewis became a target up forward, he booted 38 goals in the VFL last season and proved himself as a versatile big man as a marking forward or going into the ruck.

He got promoted for the round nine match against Brisbane at The Gabba.

In 2019 with the demise of Jarryd Roughead as the dominant forward, Lewis managed to string a few games together before returning to Box Hill with instruction to work on certain areas of his game. Five weeks later a more aggressive Lewis started to announce himself as a presence in the forward line and started to take contested marks and kick multiple goals on several occasions. He received an AFL Rising Star nomination later in the year. A shoulder injury ended his season prematurely.

Lewis changed his guernsey number to 2 before the 2020 season.
On Round 2 2022, Lewis kicked a career-best haul of 5 goals.

Personal life
Mitchell went to Wallan Primary School as a young boy. Lewis is currently studying a Bachelor of Sport Development at Deakin University.

Statistics 
Updated to the end of the 2022 season.

|-
| 2017 ||  || 39
| 0 || — || — || — || — || — || — || — || — || — || — || — || — || — || — || 0
|-
| 2018 ||  || 39
| 2 || 0 || 0 || 4 || 12 || 16 || 2 || 3 || 0.0 || 0.0 || 2.0 || 6.0 || 8.0 || 1.0 || 1.5 || 0
|-
| 2019 ||  || 8
| 12 || 20 || 15 || 92 || 46 || 138 || 56 || 19 || 1.7 || 1.3 || 7.7 || 3.8 || 11.5 || 4.7 || 1.6 || 0
|-
| 2020 ||  || 2
| 8 || 5 || 5 || 28 || 18 || 46 || 15 || 5 || 0.6 || 0.6 || 3.5 || 2.3 || 5.8 || 1.9 || 0.6 || 0
|-
| 2021 ||  || 2
| 14 || 22 || 9 || 91 || 51 || 142 || 67 || 28 || 1.6 || 0.6 || 6.5 || 3.6 || 10.1 || 4.8 || 2.0 || 0
|-
| 2022 ||  || 2
| 15 || 37 || 15 || 116 || 52 || 168 || 72 || 16 || 2.5 || 1.0 || 7.7 || 3.5 || 11.2 || 4.8 || 1.1 || 3
|- class="sortbottom"
! colspan=3| Career
! 51 !! 84 !! 43 !! 331 !! 179 !! 510 !! 212 !! 71 !! 1.6 !! 0.9 !! 6.5 !! 3.5 !! 10.0 !! 4.2 !! 1.4 || 3
|}

Notes

Honours and achievements
Team
 VFL premiership player: 2018

Individual
  leading goalkicker: 2018
  most improved player: 2022
  most promising player: 2019
 AFL Rising Star nominee: 2019

References

External links

1998 births
Living people
Hawthorn Football Club players
Box Hill Football Club players
Australian rules footballers from Victoria (Australia)
Calder Cannons players